Musa borneensis is a species of wild banana (genus Musa), native to the island of Borneo, in the Malaysian states of Sabah and Sarawak. It is placed in section Callimusa (now including the former section Australimusa), having a diploid chromosome number of 2n = 20.

Musa flavida M.Hotta is now considered to be only a variety of this species, M. borneensis var. flavida.

References

borneensis
Endemic flora of Borneo
Plants described in 1902
Taxa named by Odoardo Beccari